Mary Darby (later Hamilton, born 30 September 1954) is an equestrian from New Zealand. She competed for New Zealand at the 1984 Summer Olympics at Los Angeles, coming 22nd in the 3-day event, and was in the team which came 6th in the 3-day team event.

References

Books
Black Gold by Ron Palenski (2008, 2004 New Zealand Sports Hall of Fame, Dunedin) p. 43

External links 

1954 births
Equestrians at the 1984 Summer Olympics
Living people
New Zealand female equestrians
Olympic equestrians of New Zealand